Rip Tide is a 2017 Australian teen drama film. The movie was directed by Rhiannon Bannenberg, produced by Steve Jaggi and written by Georgia Harrison. It stars Debby Ryan. The coming-of-age film follows an American model (Ryan) who travels to an Australian beach town to reconnect with her family and her aspirations.

Plot
Cora Hamilton becomes overwhelmed with the constraints of her New York modelling work, while her mother, Sofia works to secure her a lucrative contract with a popular agency. At her photoshoot, Cora tries to provide her own ideas on improving one of the outfits that she is modeling, but is rejected by Fairret, the director of the photoshoot, causing her to run out of the photoshoot in an emotional state.  While this is happening, a video is filmed of Cora falling down stairs, which goes viral, much to her sadness.

The video has created a lot of attention, which puts both Cora and Sofia's careers into jeopardy. Upon seeing a birthday card from her Aunt Margot, she decides to go to Australia to stay with her. Sofia and Cora have a discussion in the airport about the situation, where Cora tells Sofia that she is not running away, and that she is going in the direction her life is taking her.  She then leaves, leaving her mother in confusion.

With Chicka's encouragement, Cora learns to surf. A romantic relationship soon follows with local surfing instructor, Tom.

Cora is encouraged by Margot, Margot's mother-in-law Bee, and Chicka to help at an upcoming festival. She is given a sewing machine and encouraged to design her own collection based on post war swimwear. The longer she stays with Margot, Cora realizes that her aunt has unresolved grief over the drowning of her husband, Caleb.

Sofia has negotiated a lucrative deal for Cora to be the face of a new season campaign for a New York fashion house. Cora is faced with a dilemma to either stay, or return to her fast-paced New York career. Cora chooses to miss her flight when the prop plane refuses to carry her beloved sewing machine. She returns, in time to rescue her aunt who had gone surfing during the approaching storm. The local festival is headlined by the Cora's designed fashion show, at which her mother shows up unannounced and makes her peace with her daughter and sister.

Cast 
 Debby Ryan as Cora Hamilton
 Genevieve Hegney as Margot
 Andrew Creer as Tom
 Naomi Sequeira as Chicka
 Valerie Bader as Bee
 Aaron Jeffery as Owen
 Jeremy Lindsay Taylor as Caleb
 Danielle Carter as Sofia
 Kimie Tsukakoshi as Lily
 Marcus Graham as Farriet

Production
Production began on the feature in late 2016. The film was shot in Illawarra and the Southern Highlands, on the South Coast of New South Wales in Australia.

Debby Ryan was cast as the central character Cora, after previously starring on the Disney Channel series Jessie (2011–15). Ryan stated that she enjoyed the "freedom" of working in Australia, and noted the similarities between herself and her character in "finding herself".

Release
Rip Tide debuted at the Sydney Film Festival on 10 June 2017, and also played at the CinefestOz film festival in Western Australia.

The film was released in selected Australian cinemas in September 2017.

Rip Tide was released internationally on Netflix in January 2018.

References

External links

2017 films
2010s children's films
Australian children's drama films
2010s English-language films